Departure is the sixth studio album by American rock band Journey. It was released on February 29, 1980 by Columbia Records.

Departure was Journey's highest-charting album to that point, giving them their first appearance in the top 10 of the Billboard 200 album charts, peaking at No. 8. The album includes "Any Way You Want It", the lead off track and top 25 single.

The album featured an edgier sound, thanks partly to the "live in studio" way the songs were recorded. The band went into The Automatt studio with 19 tracks, eventually trimming down to 12.

Three singles were released off of Departure.  "Any Way You Want It" reached #23 on the Billboard Hot 100 and the follow up "Walks Like a Lady" reached #32. The last single was a medley of "Good Morning Girl" and "Stay Awhile" which only reached #55. Record World called the medley "an epic ballad" with "healthy amounts of pomp and bravado."

Departure would mark the last full-time studio album appearance of founding member Gregg Rolie, and his penultimate recording with the band: his final contributions would appear on Dream, After Dream, a soundtrack album to the Japanese film of the same name, which would also be released in 1980. Rolie had become tired of life on the road and decided to leave the band after assisting in the selection of his replacement, Jonathan Cain, then of The Babys. Rolie sang lead vocals on only one song on Departure, the ballad "Someday Soon".

In 1986, Columbia reissued Departure on compact disc in the U.S. and Europe. They subsequently remastered the album in 1996. BMG/Columbia remastered Departure again in 2006 for European, Japanese and American listeners, adding bonus tracks 13 "Natural Thing" and 14 "Little Girl".  Dave Donnelly at DNA Mastering in New York City led the 2006 project.

Track listing

Personnel
Journey
 Steve Perry – lead vocals
 Neal Schon – guitars, co-lead vocals on "People and Places", backing vocals
 Gregg Rolie – keyboards, harmonica, co-lead vocals on "Someday Soon", backing vocals
 Ross Valory – bass guitar, bass pedals, backing vocals
 Steve Smith – drums, percussion

Production
 Geoff Workman – producer, engineer, mixing
 Kevin Elson – producer, live sound
 Ken Kessie – engineer
 Jim Welch – art direction

Charts 
 

Album

Singles
Any Way You Want It

Walks Like a Lady

Good Morning Girl/Stay Awhile (medley)

Certifications

References

1980 albums
Albums produced by Geoff Workman
Journey (band) albums
Columbia Records albums
Albums produced by Kevin Elson